Spectre: Original Motion Picture Soundtrack is the soundtrack album to the 24th James Bond film of the same name. Released by Universal Music Classics on 23 October 2015 in the United Kingdom and on 6 November 2015 in the United States, the music was composed by Thomas Newman, who previously composed the soundtrack of the 23rd Bond film Skyfall, making him the third composer after John Barry and David Arnold (and the first non-British composer) to score more than one film in the series. The film's theme song "Writing's on the Wall" performed by Sam Smith is the fourth theme song (not counting instrumental-only theme songs) that doesn't feature the title of its film in the lyrics. It is also the third song after "You Know My Name" (2006) and "Skyfall" (2012) that did not appear on the film's official soundtrack album.

Development
Thomas Newman returned as Spectres composer. Rather than composing the score once the film had moved into post-production, Newman worked during filming. The theatrical trailer released in July 2015 contained a rendition of  John Barry's On Her Majesty's Secret Service theme. Mendes revealed that the final film would have more than one hundred minutes of music. London Voices provided the choral element to the soundtrack, most noticeably in "Backfire".

In September 2015 it was announced that Sam Smith and regular collaborator Jimmy Napes had written the film's title theme, "Writing's on the Wall", with Smith performing it for the film. The song was released later that month where it received mixed reviews from critics and fans, particularly in comparison to Adele's "Skyfall". It became the first Bond theme to reach number one in the UK Singles Chart.

Track listing

See also
 James Bond music
 Outline of James Bond

References

External links

Soundtrack albums from James Bond films
Thomas Newman albums
2015 soundtrack albums
2010s film soundtrack albums